Adulthood is the period of being an adult.

Adulthood may also refer to:

Common uses
 Legal adulthood, the age legally defined as adult

Arts, entertainment, and media
 Adulthood (album) 2011 album
 Adulthood (film) 2008 film

See also
 Adolescence
 Adult (disambiguation)
 Babyhood (disambiguation)
 Childhood (disambiguation)
 Early adulthood (disambiguation)
 Hood (disambiguation)
 Young adulthood